Libocedrus plumosa, with the common name kawaka, is a species of Libocedrus that is endemic to New Zealand.

Distribution
The tree is native to the North Island from south of 35°S and from Cape Farewell to Whanganui Inlet area and locally at the north end of the South Island, near Nelson (41° S).

It is an IUCN Red List Near threatened species, that is endangered by habitat loss.

Description

The bark is loose, fibrous and light brown.

The foliage is arranged in flattened sprays; the leaves are scale-like, arranged in opposite decussate pairs on the shoots; the facial leaves are 1–2 mm long and 1 mm broad, and the lateral leaves distinctly larger, 2–5 mm long and 1.5–2 mm broad.

The seed cones are cylindrical, 12–18 mm long, with four scales each with a prominent curved spine-like bract; they are arranged in two opposite decussate pairs around a small central columella; the outer pair of scales is small and sterile, the inner pair large, each bearing two winged seeds. They are mature about six to eight months after pollination. The pollen cones are 3–5 mm long.

Cultivation
The kawaka has been planted as an ornamental tree in several parts of the British Isles, including as far north as Castlewellan, Northern Ireland.

References
 

plumosa
Endemic flora of New Zealand
Flora of the North Island
Flora of the South Island
Trees of New Zealand
Trees of mild maritime climate
Near threatened flora of Oceania
Taxonomy articles created by Polbot